Cell division protein kinase 8 is an enzyme that in humans is encoded by the CDK8 gene.

Function 

The protein encoded by this gene is a member of the cyclin-dependent protein kinase (CDK) family. CDK8 and cyclin C associate with the mediator complex and regulate transcription by several mechanisms. CDK8 binds to and/or phosphorylates several transcription factors, which can have an activating or inhibitory effect on transcription factor function. CDK8 phosphorylates the Notch intracellular domain, SREBP, and STAT1 S727. CDK8 also inhibits transcriptional activation by influencing turnover of subunits in the mediator complex tail module. In addition, CDK8 influences binding of RNA polymerase II to the mediator complex.

Clinical significance 

CDK8 is a colorectal cancer oncogene: the CDK8 gene is amplified in human colorectal tumors, activating β-catenin-mediated transcription that drives colon tumorigenesis. However, CDK8 may not be oncogenic in all cell types, and indeed may act as a tumor suppressor in the notch and EGFR signaling pathways. Specifically, CDK8 promotes turnover of the notch intracellular domain, and inhibits EGFR signaling-driven cell fates in C. elegans. Thus, CDK8 may be an oncogene in cancers driven by Wnt/β-catenin signaling, but could instead be a tumor suppressor gene in cancers driven by notch or EGFR signaling. In addition, CDK8 promotes transcriptional activation mediated by the tumor suppressor protein p53, indicating that it may have an important role in tumor suppression  Further research is needed to delineate the effects of CDK8 inhibition in different tissues, so for the time being, drugs targeting CDK8 for cancer treatment remain untested in humans.

An autosomal dominant syndrome has been described that is associated with mutations in the ATP binding pocket of the kinase domain. The clinical features include agenesis of the corpus callosum, mild to moderate intellectual disability, hypotonia, seizures, hearing or visual impairments, behavioral disorders, variable facial dysmorphism, congenital heart disease and ano-rectal malformations.

As a potential drug target 

The natural product cortistatin A is a potent and selective inhibitor of CDK8 and CDK19. Inhibition of CDK8 and CDK19 with cortistatin A suppresses AML cell growth and has anticancer activity in animal models of AML by causing selective and disproportionate up regulation of super-enhancer-associated genes including the cell identity genes CEBPA and IRF8.

Interactions 

Cyclin-dependent kinase 8 has been shown to interact with:

 CCNC 
 CREB binding protein 
 CRSP3
 MED1 
 MED12 
 MED14 
 MED16 
 MED17 
 MED21 
 MED24 
 MED26 
 MED6 
 Notch proteins
 POLR2A
 SMARCB1 
 STAT1
 SREBP

References

Further reading

External links 
 
 
 

Cell cycle
Proteins
EC 2.7.11